The brewster (B) is a non-SI unit used to measure the susceptibility of a material to photoelasticity, or the value of the stress-optic coefficient of the material. The unit has dimensions reciprocal to those of stress. One brewster is defined to be equal to  square metres per newton (m2/N or 1/Pa) or   square centimetres per dyne (cm2/dyn). The unit is named after David Brewster, who discovered stress-induced birefringence in 1816.

External links
Definition of the Brewster

Non-SI metric units